Kutteem Kolum (also written as Kuttiyum Kolum) is a 2013 Malayalam comedy film directed by Guinness Pakru, who made his directorial debut with this film. Starring Guinness Pakru, Munna, Adithya and Sanusha in the lead roles, the film was produced by Ansar Vasco under the banner United Films. The script was written by Suresh Satheesh, while the story was written by Pakru himself which revolves around the bonding between friends living in an imaginary village named Kumarapuram bordering Tamil Nadu. Cinematography was handled by A.Vinod Bharathi, and the stills by Vibin Velayudhan. The film released on 30 March 2013.

Cast

Soundtrack
Music was composed by Shaan Rahman and the lyrics were penned by Vayalar Sarath Chandra Varma and Vinayak. The audio was launched in late March 2013.

Reception
Aswin J Kumar of The Times of India gave 2 out of 5 and wrote "Pakru has nothing new to offer in Kutiyum Kolum except that it is his debut directorial venture". Veeyen of nowrunning.com gave 1.5 out of 5 and wrote "Toying with an idea that has long been thrashed, Pakru does the unthinkable by deciding to craft it into a two-hour long film". The film was subsequently dubbed and released in Tamil as Sakthi Vinayagam after the lead characters.

References

2013 films
Indian comedy films
2010s Malayalam-language films
Films scored by Shaan Rahman
2013 comedy films